Sam Roscoe (born 16 June 1998) is an English professional footballer who currently plays for NIFL Premiership side Linfield.

Career

Aberdeen
Roscoe's career began within the Aberdeen Youth Academy with him rising  through the ranks until he signed a professional contract in June 2016. In total he made 4 appearances for Aberdeens U20/U21 side in the Challenge Cup between 2016–2018, however he failed to make an appearance for the first team, but his future looked promising so Aberdeen looked to loan him out for the 2018—19 season.

Alloa Athletic loan
On 30 August 2018, Roscoe moved to Scottish Championship team Alloa Athletic on loan. The loan was extended on 8 January 2019, for the remainder of the season making a total of 25 appearances.

Ayr United
On 13 June 2019, Roscoe signed a two-year deal with Ayr United. Roscoe made his debut for Ayr United on 13 July against Berwick Rangers in the Scottish League Cup which they won 7-0. Roscoe scored his first senior goal in September, against Wrexham A.F.C. in the Scottish Challenge Cup in a 1-1 draw.

Linfield
Roscoe signed a two-year contract with Linfield in June 2021.

Career statistics

References 

1998 births
Living people
English footballers
Aberdeen F.C. players
Alloa Athletic F.C. players
Association football defenders
Scottish Professional Football League players
Ayr United F.C. players
Linfield F.C. players